Juan Rafael Méndez Zúñiga (born 5 September 1985 in León) is a Mexican footballer, who plays as defender for La Piedad in Mexico.

Méndez made his professional debut for Petroleros de Salamanca on November 25, 2007, against Indios de Ciudad Juárez (when they were still in the Primera A). Indios won that affair, 2–1.

For the Apertura 2009, when Salamanca was dissolved and relocated to La Piedad, Méndez left as well.

References

External links
 {{Liga MX player|

1985 births
Living people
Mexican footballers
Association football defenders
Salamanca F.C. footballers
La Piedad footballers
Ascenso MX players
Footballers from Guanajuato
Sportspeople from León, Guanajuato